Joey Hood (born December 11, 1976) is a Republican member of the Mississippi House of Representatives from Ackerman, Mississippi. Hood attended the French Camp Academy in French Camp, Mississippi and received a history and political science degree from Mississippi State University. He then worked for Republican senator Trent Lott in Washington D.C. Hood later returned to Mississippi to study at the Mississippi College School of Law and became a law clerk and attorney.

On August 2, 2011, Hood won a Republican primary election and stood as his party's candidate for District 35. No Democrat ran against him and Hood easily defeated the Libertarian candidate in the November 8, 2011 general election.

References

1976 births
Living people
Republican Party members of the Mississippi House of Representatives
Mississippi College School of Law alumni
21st-century American politicians
People from Ackerman, Mississippi
French Camp Academy